Tales of The Kama Sutra 2: Monsoon is a 2001 American-Indian erotic dramatic thriller film directed by Jag Mundhra, with an original soundtrack by Alan DerMarderosian. The film takes its title from the ancient Indian text the Kama Sutra.

Cast 
 Richard Tyson
 Jenny McShane
 Helen Brodie
 Gulshan Grover
 Doug Jeffery
 Matt McCoy (actor)

See also
 Kama Sutra: A Tale of Love
 Tales of The Kama Sutra: The Perfumed Garden
Kamasutra 3D

References

2001 films
Films set in India
Indian erotic drama films
English-language Indian films
Films by Desi directors
Indian erotic thriller films
Films based on the Kama Sutra
Films directed by Jag Mundhra
2000s erotic drama films
Indian sequel films
2000s erotic thriller films
2001 drama films
2000s English-language films
1990s English-language films